Breaking Point is a Discovery Channel Canada television show, hosted by Jonathan Tippett and Chris Hackett.  Each episode was an hour long. The series was narrated by voice actor Graeme Spicer.

Breaking point premiered on Monday, January 18, 2010. Season 1 is six episodes long.

Each episode, something is selected to be broken, and improved. The first half of each episode involves breaking the object. The second half involves fixing it.

Breaking point was not renewed after the 2010 season.

List of episodes

References

External links 
 Discovery Channel Canada, Breaking Point
 

Discovery Channel (Canada) original programming
2010 Canadian television series debuts
2010s Canadian documentary television series
2010 Canadian television series endings